The Book Stop Intramuros is a pop-up library located in Plaza Roma, Intramuros, Manila. The unit was designed and conceptualized by William Ti and commissioned in 2016 by the WTA Architecture + Design Studio (WTA). In June 2017, the management and ownership of the Book Stop Intramuros was transferred to the Intramuros Administration.

The Book Stop Intramuros is a component of WTA's The Book Stop Project Network which explores how libraries need to evolve, attract and engage contemporary users, and promote reading for the younger generations.

Awards 
Some of the awards received by Book Stop Intramuros:
Architizer People's and Jury's Choice Award, New York City, USA (2016);
Shortlist for World Building of the Year, World Architecture Festival, Berlin, Germany (2016);

References

Plazas in Manila
Buildings and structures in Intramuros
Cultural Properties of the Philippines in Metro Manila
Landmarks in the Philippines